Shane Williams (born 14 August 1959) is a former Australian rules footballer who played with Richmond, Geelong and Footscray in the Victorian Football League (VFL) during the 1980s.

Originally playing in Melbourne with Essex Heights, a Richmond feeder club, he impressed with his speed and skills. Williams, a half forward flanker, had a VFL career plagued by injuries and could only manage six senior appearances in his first three years at Richmond. He was on the wing when Richmond lost the 1982 Grand Final, having broken into the team earlier in the year and played 18 successive games leading up to the premiership decider.

After not playing a single game in 1984, the North Hobart recruit crossed to Geelong the following season and managed 16 games in his first year. He then suffered a shoulder injury and was offloaded to Footscray during the 1987 season where he would finish his career.
He currently resides in Hobart with his family.

References

Holmesby, Russell and Main, Jim (2007). The Encyclopedia of AFL Footballers. 7th ed. Melbourne: Bas Publishing.

1959 births
Living people
Richmond Football Club players
Geelong Football Club players
Western Bulldogs players
North Hobart Football Club players
Sandy Bay Football Club coaches
Australian rules footballers from Tasmania